The Duneland School Corporation is the school system that serves Jackson Township, Liberty Township, part of Pine Township, and Westchester Township, Porter County, Indiana, United States.  Westchester Township has numerous small towns, including Chesterton, Porter, Dune Acres, and Burns Harbor. The corporation had 5,874 students in 9 schools as of the 2018–19 school year.

Schools
High Schools (9-12)
 Chesterton High School
Middle Schools (7-8)
 Chesterton Middle School
Intermediate Schools (5-6)
 Liberty Intermediate School
 Westchester Intermediate School
Elementary Schools (K-4)
 Bailly Elementary School
 Brummitt Elementary School
 Jackson Elementary School
 Liberty Elementary School
 Yost Elementary School

References

External links
 

Education in Porter County, Indiana
School districts in Indiana
1969 establishments in Indiana
School districts established in 1969